Andreea Diaconu (born 28 March 1991) is a Romanian model. She is one of the most popular models from Romania. She has been featured on the covers of magazines from France, Romania, Russia, Spain, and Switzerland. Diaconu posed for Vogue magazine for the first time at age 21, for the February 2013 issue.  She is the face of Gucci, Dolce & Gabbana, and Belstaff. In 2014, she was part of the spring campaign for Belstaff, featuring David Beckham.

Diaconu is notably the second Romanian, after Diana Moldovan, to pose for the famous Victoria's Secret catalog.  Moldovan and Diaconu have also opened three health food restaurants called Moo Moo near Bucharest.

Biography
Diaconu was 11 years old when a local scout first approached her to enter the field of modeling; however, she did not take them up on their offer until she was 13. She was discovered while swimming in a public pool. She explained her initial reluctance to become a model in an interview with the Daily Front Row, saying that the preconception of models is not great where she comes from, which is why she was not attracted to the idea. She added that encouragement from her friends and the money convinced her to pursue a career in modeling. Diaconu further elaborates on her first few years as a model in this excerpt from an interview with WSJ magazine:

If she were not a model, she has described her dream job as either a karate instructor, translator, or surfer. Other than one show in London at age 13, Diaconu first showed on the runway during Milan Fashion Week Spring/Summer 2006 at age 14 for Dolce & Gabbana. She later moved to New York City when she was 20 years old to continue pursuing her career as a model.

Other than modeling, she has expressed interest in attending college and stated in an interview with Into the Gloss in September 2014 that she was studying social psychology at Wesleyan University.  Diaconu can speak five languages, including three fluently along with some French, Italian, and some basic Mandarin.

Career
Diaconu has appeared on the covers of French, American, Spanish, Dutch, German, Brazilian, Korean, Mexican, and Turkish Vogue, French, Russian, and Romanian Elle, and W.

Diaconu has walked the runways for Roberto Cavalli, Prada, Tommy Hilfiger, Bottega Veneta, Gucci, Dolce & Gabbana, Michael Kors, Balmain, DKNY, John Galliano, Chanel, Blumarine, Versace, Oscar de la Renta, Emilio Pucci, Ralph Lauren, Salvatore Ferragamo, Marchesa, Giorgio Armani, Thierry Mugler, Moschino, Stella McCartney, DSquared2, Tom Ford, Vera Wang, Carolina Herrera, rag+bone, Chloé, Missoni, Gianfranco Ferré, Emporio Armani, Prabal Gurung, Céline, and Lanvin.

She has appeared in advertising campaigns for Viktor & Rolf, Gucci, Hugo Boss, Donna Karan, Céline, Tiffany & Co., De Beers, Chloé, Ralph Lauren, Dolce & Gabbana, Tod's, Salvatore Ferragamo, David Yurman, Giuseppe Zanotti, Trussardi, Isabel Marant, Balmain, Max Mara, Adolfo Dominguez, Custo Barcelona, J. Crew, H&M, Juicy Couture, and Gap.

She is currently the face of Donna Karan's Cashmere Mist fragrance campaign as well as Viktor & Rolf's Flowerbomb fragrance campaign.

Thanks to her representation company ZMGROUP, Diaconu is always active in major magazine covers and fashion shows.

Philanthropy
Although she states that while she is not an activist, she believes in fighting against racism and homophobia in her own country as well as building "sustainable environment and economical growth in places such as Nairobi, where rape among 6-15 year olds is not uncommon". When asked what she would stand up for, she said:

She is involved with the St. Jude Children's Research Hospital, and Art and Abolition, an organization dedicated to ending child sex slavery in East Africa.

References

External links
Andreea Diaconu at The Fashion Styles

1991 births
Living people
Models from Bucharest
Romanian female models
IMG Models models